Robert Simon may refer to:
 Robert Simon (biker) (1951–1999), American criminal, Philly Warlocks MC  founding member and multiple murderer
 Robert E. Simon (1914–2015), real estate and business developer who designed a planned community in Reston, Virginia
 Robert F. Simon (1908–1992), American actor
 Robert A. Simon (1897–1981), American writer, translator, and music critic
 Robert B. Simon, American art dealer who discovered Leonardo da Vinci's Salvator Mundi

See also

Bob Simon (1941–2015), American television journalist